Junius George Groves (April 12, 1859 – August 17, 1925) was an American farmer and entrepreneur remembered as one of the wealthiest black Americans of the nineteenth and early twentieth centuries. Known as the "Potato King of the World" by 1902, Groves optimized potato growth methods, out-producing anyone else in the world to that point. His vast financial success—‌analyzed further in Booker T. Washington's The Negro in Business (1907)—‌was utilized to help combat racism by providing economic opportunities for other black Americans.

Biography 
Junius George Groves, the son of Martin and Mary Anderson Groves, was born in slavery on April 12, 1859, in Green County, Kentucky. After emancipation, he received some public schooling three months out of the year, but taught himself to read, write, and understand mathematics. As a freedman, with just 90 cents to his name, Groves ventured to Edwardsville, Kansas, during the Exodus of 1879, where he married Matilda E. Stewart a year later. The couple had 14 children, 12 of whom survived into adulthood. After working as a sharecropper, Groves began purchasing farmland in 1884; by 1905, his holdings included about 500 acres. He and Matilda grew the farm and were able to build a 22-room mansion on the property.

Groves purchased and shipped produce—‌most famously potatoes—‌throughout North America. His other financial ventures included owning and operating a general goods store in Edwardsville, stock in mines in Indian Territory and New Mexico, and stock in Kansas banks; he also founded or co-founded the Negro Business League, the Pleasant Hill Baptist Church, the Kaw Valley Potato Association, and the Sunflower State Agricultural Association. Booker T. Washington, who featured Groves in his book The Negro in Business (1907), had high praise for him, describing Groves as "our most successful Negro farmer."

By 1902, Groves was considered the "Potato King of the World". His superior methods led to the production of 721,500 bushels of the crop in a single year, out-producing anyone else in the world to that point. His worth was estimated at $80,000 in 1904 and at $300,000 in 1915; he is considered one of the most prosperous black Americans of the late nineteenth and early twentieth centuries. At the height of his success, he had constructed a 22-room mansion equipped with the latest comforts of the era.

Groves utilized his wealth and influence to combat racism. During the growing season, as many as 50 laborers—‌both black and white—‌worked on his farm. He founded a black American community center in Edwardsville and a golf course for black citizens, perhaps the first of its kind in the country.

Groves died of a heart attack at the age of 66. His funeral, one local newspaper reported, was the "largest ever in Edwardsville"; he is thought to be buried in Groves Cemetery, near the community center he founded.

References

External links

1859 births
1925 deaths
American freedmen
People from Green County, Kentucky
People from Wyandotte County, Kansas
Businesspeople from Kansas
Farmers from Kansas
20th-century African-American people